Glaphyrina is a genus of large sea snails, marine gastropod mollusc in the family Fasciolariidae.

Species
Species in the genus Glaphyrina include:

 Glaphyrina caudata (Quoy & Gaimard, 1833)
 † Glaphyrina excelsa (Suter, 1917) 
 † Glaphyrina paucispiralis Beu, 1967 
 Glaphyrina plicata Powell, 1929)
Species brought into synonymy
 Glaphyrina marwicki Beu, 1965 † : synonym of Glaphyrina plicata Powell, 1929
 Glaphyrina progenitor Finlay, 1926 † : synonym of Glaphyrina caudata (Quoy & Gaimard, 1833)
 Glaphyrina vulpicolor (G. B. Sowerby II, 1880) : synonym of Glaphyrina caudata (Quoy & Gaimard, 1833)

References

External links
 Finlay H.J. (1926). A further commentary on New Zealand molluscan systematics. Transactions of the New Zealand Institute. 57: 320-485, pls 18-23 

Fasciolariidae
Extant Miocene first appearances
Taxa named by Harold John Finlay